Raymond Lenn Berry (born October 28, 1963) is a former professional American football linebacker in the National Football League. He played seven seasons for the Minnesota Vikings (1987–1992) and the Seattle Seahawks (1993).

Career
Ray played his high school football for the O.H. Cooper High School Cougars in Abilene, Texas and was named as a Parade Magazine High School All-American as a senior during the 1981–1982 school year. (See, Abilene Reporter News, May 12, 1982, page 2C)

At Baylor University, Ray was named as Sports Illustrated College Football Defensive Player of the Week for his role, including a game-saving interception near the end of the game, in Baylor's upset of #2 ranked University of Southern California in Los Angeles. (See, Sports Illustrated, September 30, 1985, page 67)

In 2005, Ray was inducted into the Baylor Athletics Hall of Honor (See, http://www.baylorbears.com/genrel/112003aab.html)
and was named as a Legend of Baylor Football in 2007. (See, http://www.baylorbears.com/sports/m-footbl/spec-rel/092906aaa.html)

1963 births
Living people
People from Lovington, New Mexico
Players of American football from New Mexico
American football linebackers
Baylor Bears football players
Minnesota Vikings players
Seattle Seahawks players